USS Mobile (AKA-115/LKA-115) was a Charleston class amphibious cargo ship named after the city of Mobile, Alabama. She was the fourth U.S. Navy ship to bear that name. She served as a commissioned ship for 24 years and 4 months. LKAs had the distinction of being the only ships in the "Gator Navy" that were not flat bottom. They would drop anchor several hundred yards offshore and use their Mike 8s (LCM-8) and Mike 6s (LCM-6) to ferry in the Marines and their equipment.

The name was assigned on 6 November 1967, and the ship was laid down at the Newport News Shipbuilding and Dry Dock Co., Newport News, VA, 15 January 1968 as AKA-115. As of the date of her article in DANFS, she was still under construction, and was scheduled to be completed in early spring 1969.

Mobile was extensively involved in the Vietnam War.

In April 1975, Mobile participated in Operation Frequent Wind, the evacuation of Saigon, Vietnam.

Mobile took part in WestPac 84 and was involved in numerous operations. In the Gulf War, she was part of an 18-ship amphibious task force that was the largest such force since the Korean War. The task force arrived on station in the North Arabian Sea on 12 January 1991.

The ship was decommissioned on 4 February 1994 at Long Beach, California. She is berthed at the Naval Inactive Ship Maintenance Facility in Philadelphia, Pennsylvania.

Mobile earned 15 awards and campaign ribbons for her service.

References

External links

Naval Historical Center: USS Mobile IV
Naval Historical Center Gulf War Chronology, January 1991
NavSource Online: AKA / LKA-115 Mobile
USS Mobile commemorative site
Military.com: USS Mobile
51 Years of AKAs

 

USS Mobile LKA-115 was part of the Operation Eagle Claw rescue attempt in April 1980. Awards issued to crew from that rescue attempt included the Navy expeditionary medal and Armed Forces expeditionary Medals issued July 1980 for participation in the Rescue attempt called Eagle Claw.

OS2 Richard Medeiros, USN, coordinated emergency evacuation establishing communications with AFB in Germany from USS Mobile CIC center.

Charleston-class amphibious cargo ships
Cold War amphibious warfare vessels of the United States
Vietnam War amphibious warfare vessels of the United States
Ships built in Newport News, Virginia
Mobile, Alabama
1968 ships